Song Hye-rim (24 January 1937 18 May 2002) was a North Korean actress, best known for being the one-time favored mistress of Kim Jong-il.

Early life and education
Song was born in Changnyeong when Korea was under Imperial Japanese rule. She entered Pyongyang Movie College in 1955, but left the following year to give birth to a daughter. She later re-enrolled and graduated, having her film debut in 1960. She became a popular actress in the 1960s, appearing in movies including Onjŏngryŏng and Baek Il-hong.

Most accounts of Song are drawn from the memoirs of her sister, Song Hye-rang. Her former friend Kim Young-soon published her memoir I was Song Hye-rim's Friend, and revealed that she and her family were sent to a concentration camp for ten years after she found out Hye-rim's secret, namely, that she was Kim Jong-il's mistress, a fact that was hidden at the time even from Kim Il-sung. This resulted in death of her parents and children, and her husband was taken away to never be seen again. She managed to defect to South Korea in 2003.

Personal life
Song began dating Kim Jong-il in 1968, after divorcing her first husband; she is believed to have been his first mistress.The birth of her son is said to have been kept secret from Kim Il-sung until 1975.

Defection and death
Starting in the early 1980s, Song travelled to Moscow frequently for medical care. In 1996, Song was reported to have defected to the West, but intelligence officials in South Korea denied the story. She is reported to have died on 18 May 2002. Some reports say she died in Moscow.

See also

History of North Korea

Notes

References

External links
L.A. Times piece on Song's childhood friend

1937 births
2002 deaths
Kim dynasty (North Korea)
North Korean expatriates in Russia
North Korean expatriates in the Soviet Union
People from Changnyeong County
North Korean film actresses
20th-century North Korean actresses
Burials in Troyekurovskoye Cemetery
20th-century North Korean women